A Futurity is a reference to a future occurrence. It may also refer to:
Future
Futurity (horse competition), equestrian competition for younger horses, such as specific horse races, wherein they must be nominated well in advance of the actual competition.
Futurity, Colorado, a community in the United States
Dr. Futurity, a novel by Philip K. Dick
Futurity Stakes (disambiguation), horse races with this title
MV Futurity, a British ship
Futurity (website), a nonprofit site that features the latest discoveries by scientists at top research universities